Academy of the Assumption was a Catholic all-girls school that was located on Biscayne Bay in Miami, Florida, United States.

Built in 1943 and closed in 1976, it was run by the Religious of the Assumption. The school's last principal was 
Sr. Therese Margaret Duross R.A.  After being closed, the facilities were sold. Most buildings have since been demolished, replaced by luxury high-rise condominiums that dot the area's skyline. However, some buildings are still standing and in use. The Assumption Chapel remains active, now a part of St. Jude Melkite Catholic Church.

Notable alumni
 Cristina Saralegui '66

References

Sources
 The Miami News, Liquidation Sale Clears Out Academy Of The Assumption by Eliott Rodriguez, July 17, 1978, Page 4A.
 The Miami News, Condo To Tower 41 Stories, by Larry Birger, July 25, 1979, Page 1A
 The Miami Daily News, Chapel Cornerstone is Laid at Academy, May 3, 1946, Page  1B.

Defunct Catholic schools in the United States
Roman Catholic Archdiocese of Miami
Defunct schools in Florida
Defunct girls' schools in the United States
1943 establishments in Florida
1976 disestablishments in Florida
Girls' schools in Florida